Closter may refer to:

Closter (surname)
Closter, New Jersey, a borough in Bergen County, New Jersey, United States
Closter, Nebraska, an unincorporated community in Boone County, Nebraska, United States

See also
 Kloster (disambiguation)